A soundbase or sound base is a special loudspeaker enclosure designed for a television to stand on. It creates a reasonable stereo effect from a single cabinet, and was invented to substitute for the relatively poor sound quality of loudspeakers built into flat-screen TVs.

Soundbases are similar in function to soundbars, except that the latter are designed to be placed on a shelf separate to the TV or hung on the wall below it. The shape of soundbases typically enables them to have better bass than soundbars; soundbars hence often have a separate subwoofer to compensate.

References

American inventions
Loudspeakers